Kristi Qose (born 10 June 1995) is an Albanian professional footballer who plays as a defensive midfielder for Slovak club Zemplín Michalovce. He previously played for Czech club Viktoria Plzeň.

Club career

Early career
Qose born in Korçë, Albania and his family moved to Greece when he was young. He grow up at academies of PAOK among Ergys Kaçe, another Albanian expatriate footballer.

PAOK
He made his debut on 13 April 2014 playing the full 90-minutes match against Levadiakos, finished in the 3–2 loss.

Loan to Apollon 1926
In August 2014 he was loaned out to Apollon Pontou to gain more experience.

International career

Albania U19
He made it his first international debut with Albania national under-19 football team in the 2014 UEFA European Under-19 Championship qualifying round in a 1–0 loss against Greece U19 in the opening match. He played the full 90-minutes match and received a yellow card in the 57th minute. He played another full 90-minutes match against Slovakia U19 match finished in a 1–1 draw and played as a starter for 86 minutes in the closing match against Bulgaria U19 when he was substituted off for Mario Kame in another 1–1 draw.

Albania U21
Qose advanced higherly at international level as he was called up for the first time with Albania national under-21 football team by coach Skënder Gega for the friendly match against Italy U21 on 6 May 2014.

2017 UEFA European Under-21 Championship qualification
Qose was called up for the 2017 UEFA European Under-21 Championship qualification opening match against Liechtenstein on 28 March 2015. He made it his competitive debut for under-21 side against Liechtenstein playing as a starter in the 0–2 away victory where he was substituted off in the 77th minute for Klaudio Hyseni. He managed to play another two matches as a starter during campaign but were substituted off in the second half and one other as a substitute.

Albania senior team
He was called up by Albania national football team coach Gianni De Biasi for the match against San Marino on 8 June 2014. He debuted for senior team against San Marino, coming on as a substitute in the 73rd minute in place of Andi Lila.

Career statistics

Club

International

Honours
PAOK
 Superleague Greece Runner-up: 2013–14
 Greek Football Cup Runner-up: 2013–14

References

External links
 
 PAOK profile
 
 

1995 births
Living people
Footballers from Korçë
Albanian footballers
Association football defenders
Association football midfielders
Albania under-21 international footballers
Albania youth international footballers
Albania international footballers
PAOK FC players
Panserraikos F.C. players
MFK Zemplín Michalovce players
MFK Ružomberok players
MFK Karviná players
Super League Greece players
Slovak Super Liga players
Czech First League players
Albanian expatriate footballers
Albanian expatriate sportspeople in Greece
Expatriate footballers in Greece
Albanian expatriate sportspeople in Slovakia
Expatriate footballers in Slovakia
Albanian expatriate sportspeople in the Czech Republic
Expatriate footballers in the Czech Republic
FC Viktoria Plzeň players